Larinioides is a genus of orb-weaver spiders commonly known as flying spiders and first described by Lodovico di Caporiacco in 1934. They mostly occur in temperate climates around the northern hemisphere. The name is derived from the related araneid spider genus Larinia, with the meaning "like Larinia".

Species
 it contains seven species:
Larinioides chabarovi (Bakhvalov, 1981) – Russia (Central Siberia to Far East)
Larinioides cornutus (Clerck, 1757) – North America, Europe, Turkey, Israel, Caucasus, Russia (Europe to Far East), Iran, China, Korea, Japan
Larinioides ixobolus (Thorell, 1873) – Western Europe to Central Asia
Larinioides jalimovi (Bakhvalov, 1981) – Russia (Far East), Korea
Larinioides patagiatus (Clerck, 1757) – North America, Europe, Turkey, Caucasus, Russia (Europe to Far East), Central Asia, China, Mongolia, Japan
Larinioides sclopetarius (Clerck, 1757) – Europe, Caucasus, Russia (Europe to Central Asia), China, Korea. Introduced to North America
Larinioides suspicax (O. Pickard-Cambridge, 1876) – Europe, North Africa to Central Asia

References

External links

Araneidae
Araneomorphae genera
Spiders of Asia
Spiders of Africa